Bhoodol also spelled as Bhudol is a village in Ajmer tehsil of Ajmer district of Rajasthan state in India. The village falls under Bhoodol gram panchayat.

Demography 
As per 2011 census of India, Bhoodol has population of 4,095 of which 2,115 are males and 1,980 are females. Sex ratio of the village is 936.

Transportation
Bhoodol is connected by air (Kishangarh Airport), by train (Madar railway station) and by road.

See also
Ajmer Tehsil
Madar railway station

References

Villages in Ajmer district